Thomas Hopson may refer to:

Peregrine Hopson (1685-1759), British army officer, Governor of Nova Scotia.
Sir Thomas Hopsonn (1642-1717), British naval officer.